Wenn or WENN may refer to:

WENN (AM), a radio station (1320 AM) licensed to Birmingham, Alabama, United States
Remember WENN, a television series that aired from 1996 to 1998 on American Movie Classics 
World Entertainment News Network, an entertainment news wire service based in London, England
Former callsign of WERC-FM, a radio station (105.5 FM) licensed to Hoover, Alabama, United States
Former callsign of WACT, a radio station (1420 AM) licensed to Tuscaloosa, Alabama, United States
St Wenn, village and parish in the Restormel district of mid-Cornwall, United Kingdom
Stuart Wenn, an Australian rules football field umpire in the Australian Football League

In German-language music:
Wenn du da bist
Wenn alle untreu werden
Wenn Der Letzte Schatten Fällt, album by L'Âme Immortelle
Wenn der Himmel brennt

See also
Wenns, municipality in the Imst district of Austria